The Ayrshire Amateur Football Association is a football (soccer) league competition, primarily for amateur clubs in the Ayrshire region of Scotland.  The association was founded in 1935, making it one of the oldest in the country.  The association is affiliated to the Scottish Amateur Football Association.

Member Clubs

As of season 2018-19, the Ayrshire AFA had 44 member clubs, listed hereafter in their respective leagues :

Premier League
Ardeer West Recreation
Ardrossan CR
Cumnock AFC
Dirrans Ath
Galston Utd
Glenburn MW 
Hurlford AFC
Hurlford Thistle
Kilbride Thistle
Shortlees AFC
Stewarton Utd
Tarbolton AFC

First Division
Catrine AFC 
Craigie AFC  
Crosshill Thistle 
Crosshouse Waverley 
Dailly AFC 
Glenmuir Thistle
Irvine Meadow AFC 
Mauchline Utd 
Mossblown Boswell 
New Farm Loch AFC
Troon Dundonald
West Kilbride

Division 2A
Broomlands AFC 
Dalry AFC 
Darvel Victoria 
Dean Fenwick Thistle 
Drongan Utd 
Heathside AFC 
Kilmarnock AFC 
Kilmarnock Utd 
Symington Caledonian 
Winlinton Wolves AFC

Division 2B
Auchinleck Boswell
Beith AFC
Bellfield AFC 
Bellsdale AFC 
Irvine Meadow 
Largs Thistle AFC 
Minishant AFC 
Ochiltree Comm FC 
Onthank AFC 
Whitletts Victoria AFC

League Structure

The Ayrshire AFA is split into four single tiers - a Premier Division at the summit with three divisions below, each on a separate level. Each tier has two promotion/relegation positions between divisions.

The league setup:

External links

Website of the Ayrshire AFA

Football leagues in Scotland
Amateur association football in Scotland
1935 establishments in Scotland
Sports organizations established in 1935
Football in North Ayrshire
Football in East Ayrshire
Football in South Ayrshire